Cheikh Larbi Tébessa Airport  is a public airport located  north of Tébessa, the capital of the Tébessa province (wilaya) in Algeria.

History
During World War II, the facility was known as Tebessa Airfield.  It was a Twelfth Air Force base of operations during the North African Campaign against the German Afrika Korps.  It was operationally used by the 31st Fighter Group, which flew Supermarine Spitfires from the airfield between 17 and 21 February 1943.  It was also the headquarters of the XII Fighter Command between December 1942 and 12 January 1943.

Facilities

Airlines and destinations

References

External links
 Google Maps - Tebessi
 
 

Airports in Algeria
Buildings and structures in Tébessa Province
Airfields of the United States Army Air Forces in Algeria
World War II airfields in Algeria